The Stamford Mercury (also the Lincoln, Rutland and Stamford Mercury, the Rutland and Stamford Mercury, and the Rutland Mercury) based in Stamford, Lincolnshire, England, claims to be "Britain's oldest continuously published newspaper title". The Mercury has been published since 1712 but its masthead formerly claimed it was established in 1695 and still has "Britain's Oldest Newspaper".

Three editions (Stamford and The Deepings, Rutland, and Bourne) are published every Friday. The ABC circulation figure in 2011 was 16,675.

The Mercury is now owned by Iliffe Media; sister newspapers include The Rutland Times. In January 2017, Johnston Press sold 13 of its East Midlands and East Anglia titles (including the Mercury) to Iliffe Media for £17m.

An edition of the Mercury from 22 May 1718 is the earliest newspaper in the British Library's newspaper reading room, The Newsroom.

Archives

The Mercury possesses the largest archive of any provincial newspaper. It contains over 15,000 newspapers and is complete from the middle of the 18th century. It also holds substantial numbers of annual volumes and individual copies prior to that, dating back to 1714.

Since 2005, the archive has been in the care of the Stamford Mercury Archive Trust (www.smarchive.org.uk).  The Trust received a grant of £305,000 from the Heritage Lottery Fund to undertake a five-year conservation programme. The Trust set out to microfilm every known copy of the Stamford Mercury in existence. Access to the archive is free for personal research. A copy of the complete microfilm run of the paper is available at Stamford Library.

References

External links
 
 Mercury archive

Newspapers published in Lincolnshire
Publications established in the 1710s
1712 establishments in England
Companies based in Stamford, Lincolnshire